The life of Joseph Smith from 1827 to 1830, when he was 22–25 years old, includes some of his life's most significant events, and some of the most important history of the Latter Day Saint movement, the Restorationist religious movement he initiated during this period. This movement gave rise to Mormonism, and includes such denominations as the Church of Jesus Christ of Latter-day Saints and the Community of Christ. The period covered by this article begins in late 1827, after Smith announced he had obtained a book of golden Plates buried in a hill, guarded by an angel, near his home in Manchester, New York (near Palmyra village). (See Early life of Joseph Smith) Because of opposition by former treasure-seeking colleagues who believed they owned a share of the golden plates, Smith prepared to leave the Palmyra area for his wife's home town of Harmony, Pennsylvania (now Oakland). From late 1827 to the end of 1830, Smith would translate the golden plates, publish the Book of Mormon, and establish the Church of Christ.

To translate the golden plates, Smith enlisted the assistance of Martin Harris, a wealthy Palmyra landowner who acted as Smith's scribe. To translate, Smith used seer stones (one set of which Smith later called the Urim and Thummim), and Smith said the stones showed him the translation. Translation ceased, however, when Harris lost 116 manuscript pages of uncopied text. Translation resumed in earnest when Smith was joined in May 1829 by a Smith family associate named Oliver Cowdery. Translation was completed near the end of July 1829, and the resulting manuscript was published as the Book of Mormon on March 26, 1830, in Palmyra.

By the time the Book of Mormon was published, Smith had baptized several followers who called themselves the Church of Christ. On April 6, 1830, Smith and five others formally established the Church of Christ in western New York. Among the most notable early converts was Sidney Rigdon, a Disciples of Christ (Campbell Movement) minister from Kirtland, Ohio, who already shared many early beliefs of the Latter Day Saint movement. With Rigdon came most of Rigdon's congregation, and at the end of 1830, Smith decided that all members of his new church should move to Kirtland.

Translation of the golden plates

Recruitment of Martin Harris
When Smith said he had obtained the book of golden plates from the Angel Moroni (see Early life of Joseph Smith), he also said the angel commanded him "that the plates must be translated, printed and sent before the world". To do so, however, he needed money, and at the time he was penniless. Therefore, Smith sent his mother to the home of Martin Harris, a local landowner said at the time to be worth about $8,000 to $10,000.

Harris had been a close confidant of the Smith family since at least 1826, and he may have heard about Smith's attempts to obtain the plates from the angel even earlier from Joseph Smith Sr. He was also a believer in Smith's powers with his seer stone. When Lucy visited Harris, he had heard through the grapevine in Palmyra that Smith said he had discovered a book of Golden Plates, and he was interested in finding out more. Thus, at Lucy Smith's request, Harris went to the Smith home, heard the story from Smith, and hefted a glass box that Smith said contained the plates. Smith convinced Harris that he had the plates, and that the angel had told him to "quit the company of the money-diggers". Convinced, Harris immediately gave Smith $50, and committed to sponsor the translation of the plates.

The money provided by Harris was enough to pay all of Smith's debts in Palmyra, and for him to travel with his new bride Emma and all of their belongings to Harmony Township, Pennsylvania (now in Oakland Township), where they would be able to avoid the public commotion in Palmyra over the plates. Thus, in late October 1827, they moved to Harmony, with the glass box purportedly holding the plates hidden during the trip in a barrel of beans.

Early transcription and translation
When Joseph and Emma arrived in Harmony, they stayed temporarily in the home of Emma's father Isaac Hale, while Hale set them up in a home on an adjoining  property a few hundred yards from the Susquehanna River. Skeptical that Smith had found golden plates, Hale asked to see them, but was only allowed to lift the glass box in which Smith said they were kept. Nevertheless, Hale refused to allow the plates in his home if he could not see them, so the glass box was hidden in the woods nearby, where the plates are said to have remained during much of the translation process that followed.

After a short stay in the Hale home, Joseph and Emma arranged to live in a house moved onto the Hale property. Emma said that for at least part of the time, Joseph kept the plates in this house on a table, wrapped in a linen tablecloth. Beginning in December 1827, Smith began transcribing the characters he said were engraved on the plates, and dictating what he said was a translation of some of them. While transcribing, he reportedly sat behind a curtain and looked at the plates through the Urim and Thummim, passing the written transcriptions to Emma, who was sitting on the other side of the curtain. Eventually, after some transcription, he began to dictate what he said was a translation of the plates to Emma or her brother Reuben. To translate, he reportedly "put the urim and thummim into his hat and Darkened his Eyes than [sic] he would take a sentance [sic] and it would apper [sic] in Brite [sic] Roman Letters. Then he would tell the writer and he would write it." Reportedly, Smith did not need the physical presence of the plates to create the translation, and the plates remained in the nearby woods during the translation.

Harris came to assist with the translation in February 1828. Around this time, Smith reportedly confided to Emma's uncle that he had doubts about whether or not he should translate the plates, because despite the commandment from God, "he was afraid of the people". Thus, when Harris arrived, he reportedly had to convince Smith to continue translating, saying, "I have not come down here for nothing, and we will go on with it".

Smith then sent Harris to several well-known scholars to see if they could translate or authenticate some of the transcribed characters, but Harris was unable to get any of the scholars' help or backing. After visiting his home in Palmyra, Harris then returned to Harmony in the middle of April 1828 and began acting as Smith's scribe while Smith dictated what he later would call the Book of Lehi. Harris reported that for at least part of Smith's early translation, Smith used his seer stone to translate, rather than the Urim and Thummim, because the stone was more convenient. Smith also at least sometimes made use of a curtain; Harris stated that one time during the translation, Smith raised a curtain between him and Harris, because "the presence of the Lord was so great", or sometimes Smith dictated to Harris from upstairs or from a different room.

Loss of 116 manuscript pages

By the middle of June 1828, Smith had dictated about 116 manuscript pages of text, beginning with a story about a man named Lehi in Jerusalem, and ending with a story about King Benjamin, one of his descendants, in the Americas. Harris, however, was having marital problems with his wife Lucy, who was upset about not being able to see the plates. Hoping to appease her, and to quell his own doubts, Harris convinced a reluctant Smith to allow him to take the 116 manuscript pages with him on a visit back home in Palmyra. Because the manuscript was the only copy, however, Smith made Harris sign a written oath that he would show the pages only to five specified people in his family.

While Harris visited Palmyra, Emma gave birth to the young couple's first child, but the boy was deformed and stillborn, leaving Emma deathly ill for about two weeks. Not hearing word from Harris for three weeks, Smith traveled in July 1828 to Palmyra and learned that Harris had lost the manuscript pages, and had been avoiding him. Despite his oath, Harris had been exhibiting the manuscript to numerous visitors, and somehow it had disappeared from the drawer where he kept it.

Smith was despondent over losing his child and the manuscript. He had had great hopes for his first-born child, reportedly telling people that the child would see the plates, and that he would assist in the translation. When he heard the manuscript was lost, he exclaimed, "Oh, my God! ... All is lost! all is lost! What shall I do? I have sinned—it is I who tempted the wrath of God." After returning to Harmony without Harris, Smith dictated to Emma his first written revelation, which rebuked him for losing the manuscript pages, but pinned most of the blame upon Harris. However, the revelation assured Smith that all was not lost, because if Smith repented of what he had done, God would "only cause thee to be afflicted for a season, and thou art still chosen, and wilt again be called to the work".

During this period, Smith also reportedly joined a local Methodist Episcopal Church Sunday school class in Harmony. This church was attended by Emma's family, and led by Nathaniel Lewis, Isaac Hale's brother-in-law. His membership, however, was resisted by several members who were aware of his treasure hunting activities, and Smith voluntarily withdrew his membership.

Resumption of translation in anticipation of a "marvelous work" coming forth

As part of the penalty for losing the manuscript, Smith said the angel took away the Urim and Thummim, returning it once again on September 22, 1828, the autumn equinox and the anniversary of the day he first received the plates. Smith said the angel also temporarily took back the plates during that time.

By February 1829, Smith had begun translating sporadically with Emma as scribe. Smith resumed the translation beginning at the story of King Benjamin now found in the Book of Mosiah, where Smith had left off with Harris before losing the 116 pages. In February, when Smith's parents visited Harmony, and Smith dictated a revelation for his father, an optimistic description of the translated book as a "marvelous work…about to come forth among the children of men".

According to Emma, Smith no longer used the Urim and Thummim in translation after the loss of the 116 manuscript pages; rather, he began using exclusively his dark seer stone. He translated by sitting "with his face buried in his hat with the seer stone in it, and dictating hour after hour with nothing between us". While looking at the stone, he "rest[ed] his elbows upon his knees", and drew the hat "closely around his face to exclude the light", so that the "spiritual light" would shine.

The translation during this time was sporadic, in part because Emma was busy running the household, and Joseph was working outside the home. They received some support for the translation, however, including money for paper, from Joseph Knight Sr., Smith's associate from his treasure hunting expeditions.

In March 1829, Harris returned to Harmony and wanted to see the plates first hand. Smith reportedly told Harris that Smith "would go into the woods where the Book of Plates was, and that after he came back, Harris should follow his tracks in the snow, and find the Book, and examine it for himself"; after following these directions, however, Harris could not find the plates. The next day, Smith dictated a revelation indicating that there was no need for the present "unbelieving" generation of humanity to see the plates because—in the words of God—"if they will not believe my words" written on the plates, "they would not believe my servant Joseph, if it were possible that he could show them all things." Nevertheless, according to the revelation, the words of the plates would go forth to "this generation" accompanied by the testimonies of three witnesses who would have the exclusive privilege to "view [the plates] as they are". Harris could be one of those three witnesses if he would "go out and bow down before me [God], and humble himself in mighty prayer and faith".

Arrival of Oliver Cowdery
Part of Smith's March 1829 revelation told Smith to stop translating for a while, until there was a means whereby he could continue the translation. That "means", in Smith's view, arrived on April 5, 1829, in the form of Oliver Cowdery.

Cowdery, a school teacher born in Vermont, had heard about Smith's golden plates while he boarded with the Joseph Smith Sr. family during the school year, and had traveled with Joseph's brother Samuel Harrison Smith to Harmony hoping that he could serve as Smith's scribe. Smith was happy to have his assistance, and on April 7, 1829, Smith and Cowdery began translating full-time. During this time, they received financial support from Joseph Knight Sr.

An April 1829 revelation by Smith soon stated that Cowdery had a "gift" that could allow Cowdery to translate ancient hidden records, and that the "keys of this gift" to translate would be given both to Smith and to Cowdery. According to Smith's revelations, this gift to translate was not limited to the golden plates, but included other ancient hidden records. For example, Smith's next revelation was what he said was the translation of a hidden parchment written by John the Apostle, and presumably still hidden at the time of the translation.

While Cowdery, too, was to have the "gift" to translate, when Cowdery attempted his own translation of some unknown hidden record, he was unsuccessful, and he returned to acting as Smith's scribe. Consequently, a revelation by Smith stated that Cowdery's translation of hidden records would have to wait until after Smith had fully translated the golden plates.

With Cowdery as scribe, Smith continued dictating what he said was the translation of the golden plates. On or before May 1829, Smith dictated a revelation warning him that whoever had stolen the 116 manuscript pages was planning to wait until Smith re-translated that section of the golden plates, and then alter it, to show Smith could not translate the same words twice. Therefore, according to the revelation, God's plan was for Smith to "go on unto the finishing of the remainder of the work as you [Smith] had begun", and instead of going back and re-translating the original 116 manuscript pages, Smith was to substitute a translation which he would create from another set of plates, called the "plates of Nephi", which covered roughly the same material, except in more detail.

On May 15, 1829, according to Cowdery's later reminiscences, the translation of what is now the book of Third Nephi led Smith and Cowdery to pray so that they could receive authority to baptize. Thus, they said that an angel appeared, granting them that authority, and then they baptized each other in a river near their home in Harmony. Ten days later, they baptized Samuel, who was still residing with them.

In late May 1829, Samuel Smith returned home to Palmyra, reporting to the Smith and Harris families that Smith's translation with Cowdery as scribe was proceeding rapidly. Samuel's report excited Martin Harris, but angered Harris's wife Lucy, who gathered witnesses and filed a criminal complaint against Smith in Lyons, New York, in an attempt to prove that Smith was pretending to have the golden plates in order to defraud her husband. A trial proceeded in absentia against Smith, but was dismissed after the judge heard the testimony of Martin Harris.

Meanwhile, a group of people in Harmony began to threaten the progress of Smith's translation. Therefore, Oliver Cowdery wrote to one of his acquaintances named David Whitmer in Fayette, New York, who had previously shown an interest in the golden plates, and got permission for Smith and Cowdery to stay at David Whitmer's parents' house in Fayette], while they completed the translation. The Whitmers were happy to oblige, and offered free room and board. Thus, David Whitmer took a large wagon to Harmony at the beginning of June 1829, and moved Smith and Cowdery to Fayette. This time, rather than hiding the golden plates in the wagon during the travels as he said he did on his trip to Harmony, Smith said he gave the plates to an angel, who transported the plates and then delivered them to Smith in Fayette. However, by this time, Smith was not directly using the plates in the process of translation. Emma did not initially accompany Smith to Fayette, although she came later for a time.

Completion and publication of the Book of Mormon

Initial publication attempt
At the Whitmer home in Fayette, New York, Smith proceeded to complete the translation of the golden plates, with Cowdery acting as scribe as he did in Harmony, but with the additional assistance of David Whitmer, David's brother John Whitmer, and another scribe whose handwriting has not been identified. Smith proceeded translating to what he said was the very last of the golden plates in the translated collection, where he said he found a title page. Smith's translation of this title page indicated that the book was called The Book of Mormon: An account written by the hand of Mormon, upon plates taken from the Plates of Nephi.

On June 11, 1829, to secure his copyright, Smith deposited a copy of the title page with the local federal district court. In the early part of June 1829, Smith also took a copy of the title page and a few pages of translation to Palmyra village and attempted during several interviews to make arrangements to have his translation published by E. B. Grandin, publisher of The Wayne Sentinel and friend of Martin Harris. Although Grandin provided an approximate estimate of the costs, he initially declined to publish the book. As for funding, Smith attempted unsuccessfully to secure the financial assistance from several family acquaintances.

Twelve witnesses and the completion of translation
During the remainder of June 1829, Smith continued the work of translation in Fayette by dictating a replacement section for the 116 pages previously lost by Harris. Some time before June 14, 1829, a revelation by Smith commanded Cowdery and Whitmer to seek out twelve "disciples", who desired to serve, and who would "go into all the world to preach my gospel unto every creature", and who would be ordained to baptize and to ordain priests and teachers. Soon thereafter in the second half of June 1829, a group of Three Witnesses and a separate group of Eight Witnesses were selected, in addition to Smith himself, to testify that Smith had the golden plates.

The Three Witnesses were selected soon after a visit by Harris to the Whitmer home in Fayette, accompanied by Smith's parents, to inquire about the translation. When Harris he arrived, he joined with Oliver Cowdery and David Whitmer to request that the three be named as the Three Witnesses referred to in the much earlier revelation directed to Harris, and also referred to in a recently translated portion of the plates called the Book of Ether (2:2–4). In response, Smith dictated a revelation that the three of them would see the golden plates. Thus, Smith took the three of them to the woods near the Whitmer home and they had a shared vision in which they all claimed to see (with their "spiritual eyes", Harris reportedly said) an angel holding the golden plates and turning its leaves. The four of them also said they heard "the voice of the Lord" telling them that the translation of the plates was correct, and commanding them to testify of what they saw and heard.

The Eight Witnesses were selected a few days later when Smith traveled to Palmyra with the males of the Whitmer home, including David Whitmer's father Peter, his brothers Christian, Jacob, and John, and his brother-in-law Hiram Page. Smith took this group, along with his father Joseph Smith Sr. and his brothers Hyrum and Samuel to a location near Smith's parent's home in Palmyra where the angel had transported the plates, where Smith said he showed them the golden plates. Like the Three Witnesses, the Eight Witnesses later signed an affidavit for inclusion at the end of the Book of Mormon. Though the Eight Witnesses did not refer, like the Three, to an angel or the voice of God, they said that they had hefted the plates and seen the engravings on them.

After the experiences of the twelve witnesses, Smith continued the translation at the Whitmer home in Fayette. On June 26, 1829, E.B. Grandin published in The Wayne Sentinel a copy of the Book of Mormon title page Smith had given him earlier, and offered it to his readers as a "curiosity", stating that "[m]ost people entertain an idea that the whole matter is the result of a gross imposition, and a grosser superstition". Possibly because of this article and Smith's growing notoriety, the late stages of Smith's translation were interrupted periodically with curious visitors. Translation was completed around July 1, 1829, after which Smith reportedly returned the plates to the angel.

Publication of the Book of Mormon and associated notoriety
Smith's first attempt at arranging publication of the Book of Mormon with E.B. Grandin was unsuccessful. Harris had also unsuccessfully approached Jonathan A. Hadley, another Palmyra printer who published the anti-Masonic Palmyra Freeman. Smith and Harris also traveled to Rochester, New York and approached Thurlow Weed, an anti-Masonic publisher who, like Grandin and Hadley in Palmyra, also refused to publish the book, even though Harris offered his farm as security. Smith next approached Weed's competitor in Rochester, Elihu F. Marshall, who agreed to publish the book. With Marshall's offer in hand, Smith and Harris then approached Grandin a second time, hoping for a better offer that wouldn't require travel to Rochester. Negotiations with Grandin continued from July to August 1829. On August 25, 1829, Grandin entered into a secured transaction, using Harris's land as collateral, to print 5,000 copies of the book for $3,000, to be paid within 18 months after printing began. Half the sum was to be paid by Harris, and the other half was to be paid by Smith and his brother Hyrum.

While Smith was attempting to arrange for publication during July and August 1829, several area newspapers ran harshly critical articles on the Book of Mormon, and reprinted the title page published on June 26, 1829, in The Wayne Sentinel. This began with a Palmyra Freeman article written by Jonathan A. Hadley. Between August and October 1829, the Hadley article was reprinted in Lockport, New York, Rochester, New York, Painesville, Ohio, and Salem, Massachusetts. In July and August, the Biblical-sounding language style of the Book of Mormon's title page was satirized by a series of articles in a Rochester paper.

In October, Smith moved to Harmony, Pennsylvania to rejoin his wife Emma, leaving Oliver Cowdery in charge of supervising the publication in Palmyra. Before leaving, Smith said he had a revelation that the original manuscript should remain in the Smith home while Cowdery made a copy, then Hyrum Smith would take only enough of the transcript for each day's typesetting to Grandin's office per day, accompanied by a guard, while Peter Whitmer guarded the Smith home.

Smith arrived in Harmony on October 4, 1829, where he found the opposition that had caused his move to Fayette had abated. In order to pay his $1500 share of the costs for printing the Book of Mormon, Smith attempted unsuccessfully to raise at least $500 from his old friend Josiah Stowell. He also sent Cowdery and Hiram Page as missionaries to Toronto, unsuccessfully, to raise money by selling the book's Canadian copyright.

In January 1830, Hyrum Smith and Cowdery discovered that Abner Cole, publisher of the Palmyra newspaper The Reflector, had taken portions of the pre-published Book of Mormon and began printing them in his newspaper. The paper was printed at E. B. Grandin's printing shop on nights and weekends, and therefore Cole had access to the unpublished Book of Mormon text. Unable to convince Cole to stop printing, Hyrum and Oliver sent for Smith, who returned briefly from Harmony and convinced Cole to submit the matter to an arbitrator, who held that Cole's publication was a copyright infringement and ordered him to stop.

Later in January 1830, a group of Palmyra citizens passed a resolution calling for a local boycott of the Book of Mormon. As a result, Grandin stopped printing in January 1830. In addition, Harris was coming to realize that the full share of the $3,000 cost of printing the book would fall on his shoulders when it came due in early 1831, and under the prodding of his wife Lucy, was considering breaching his contract to pay his share. In response, Smith traveled once again from Harmony Palmyra, and placated Harris by entering into a contract on January 16, 1830 stating: "I hereby agree that Martin Harris shall have an equal privilege with me and my friends of selling the Book of Mormon of the edition now printing by Egbert B. Grandin until enough of them shall be sold to pay for the printing of the same". Smith and Harris then went to Grandin's office, and convinced Grandin to resume printing, which he did on January 26, 1830.

In late March 1830, Smith travelled once again from Harmony to Palmyra. The first advance copies of the Book of Mormon were becoming available, and Harris was attempting to sell them, but not getting any buyers. Harris, therefore, waffled on his commitment to pay the printing costs. In response, Smith dictated a revelation commanding Harris, upon penalty of eternal damnation he could not imagine, to: "Impart a portion of thy property; Yea, even a part of thy lands and all save the support of thy family. Pay the printer's debt." Harris renewed his commitment to pay the printing costs, and on March 26, 1830, Grandin made copies of the Book of Mormon available for purchase at the bookshop on the ground floor of his shop.

Early ecclesiastical leadership

Informal "Church of Christ" in 1829 and early 1830
Even before translation of the Book of Mormon was completed, Smith and Cowdery began baptizing several converts to the new faith. These adherents referred to themselves as the Church of Christ. In June 1829, in response to concerns by Cowdery, Smith dictated a revelation commanding Cowdery to "build up my church", based upon the theological principles Smith had been dictating, he said, from the golden plates. Possibly in conformance with this revelation, some time later in 1829 Cowdery said he received his own revelation, called the Articles of the Church of Christ, about "how he should build up his church & the manner thereof". Cowdery was described in his revelation as "an Apostle of Jesus Christ". Similarly, several of the other Twelve Witnesses to the Book of Mormon were described by people of the Palmyra area as "apostles" or "elders" in this new faith, and beginning in August 1829 some of them were given missions to preach the gospel.

During the winter of 1829, when Smith was attempting to raise money for the publication of the Book of Mormon, Smith is said to have received a revelation through his seer stone sending Cowdery and Hiram Page on a mission to Canada to sell the Book of Mormon's Canadian copyright for $8,000. This mission, however, was unsuccessful, and the group returned empty-handed to the Whitmer home in Fayette, New York, where Smith was then visiting. As the group did not understand why the previous revelation had directed the group to carry out an unsuccessful mission, according to the recollection of David Whitmer, Smith received another revelation indicating that "[s]ome revelations are of God: some revelations are of men; and some revelations are of the devil." In early 1830, Smith reportedly discontinued the use of his seer stones in dictating revelations, from then on dictating the revelations based solely upon the impressions the Holy Spirit was said to have put in his mind.

Formal organization of the Church of Christ

By the spring of 1830, Smith had in mind the idea that his informal body of believers who called themselves the Church of Christ should be organized as a formal, legal body. Therefore, Smith traveled from Harmony to the Manchester-Palmyra area. In March 1830, just before publication of the Book of Mormon. Smith stayed in Palmyra until April 6, 1830, the date he had chosen to formally organize the church. While in Manchester that day, a Tuesday, Smith dictated a series of short revelations, including a revelation stating that Smith was to be considered "a seer, a translator, a prophet, an apostle of Jesus Christ, an elder of the church". The revelation stated that Smith was to be the first "elder" in the Church of Christ, while Cowdery was to be the "first preacher". Then several people, including Martin Harris and Joseph Smith Sr., but apparently not Joseph Smith himself, were baptized that night in a nearby dammed-off stream. Although the baptisms were performed after dark "because of persecution", the event was witnessed by a few non-believing Palmyra residents. The majority of witnesses say this organizational event took place in the log home of Joseph Smith Sr. in the Manchester area, followed by a meeting the next Sunday in Fayette, New York. Nevertheless, one of Smith's histories, and a later statement by David Whitmer place the event in Fayette.

On April 11, 1830, the first Sunday after the Tuesday, April 6 organization date, the newly formed church held its first worship services in Fayette, attended by a much larger group of about 30 people. At least six other people were baptized that day in the nearby Seneca Lake, and at least seven others were baptized on the following Sunday, April 18, after a revelation two days earlier had stated that new converts had to be rebaptized into "a new and an everlasting covenant" regardless of any prior baptism. Oliver Cowdery, as the "first preacher", took the lead in both baptism and the giving of sermons. Smith and the leaders of his church also began teaching and baptizing in Colesville, New York, near Smith's home in Harmony, where his friend Joseph Knight Sr. lived. The Colesville meetings were "well-attended" and led to several baptisms, particularly after word got out that Smith had performed an exorcism of one of Joseph Knight's sons.

Thus, by June 1830, the new church had about 30 members. On June 9, 1830, the church held its first conference in Fayette. It was on this occasion that Smith called for a vote on the Articles and Covenants of the Church of Christ, which would serve as the church's constitution. At the conference, several said they had visions, others fainted and had to be laid on beds, others shouted hosannas.

Colesville branch
In addition to the members in the Palmyra-Manchester area and in Fayette, Smith soon found followers in Colesville, New York, a town near Harmony on the Susquehanna River. Smith's friend Joseph Knight Sr. lived there, and the Universalist Knight had been receptive to Smith's ideas. In April 1830, Smith visited Colesville and held several "well-attended" meetings. Smith achieved a great deal of notoriety when he reportedly performed an exorcism on one of Knight's sons, Newel Knight. This exorcism convinced several Colesville residents to be baptized, including eventually Newel, who traveled to Fayette in late May to be baptized, and was present during the June 9, 1830 conference, where he fell into a trance and awoke saying he'd had a theophany.

After the June 9, 1830 conference and a brief return home to Harmony, with Knight's exorcism in recent memory, Smith dictated what was described as a secret vision of Moses, not to be shown "unto any except them that believe", in which Satan attempted to convince Moses that he was Jesus. Much later, while speaking about the early history of the church, Smith said he had heard "[t]he voice of Michael on the banks of the Susquehanna, detecting the devil when he appeared as an angel of light". Although Smith did not give a date for this event, it could have occurred during this time when he was thinking about exorcisms and appearances of the devil near the Susquehanna.

In late June 1830, Smith, Emma, Cowdery, and John and David Whitmer visited Colesville and baptized Joseph Knight Sr., many of his family, and several others in the area. This activity, and the recent exorcism of Newel Knight, aroused the animosity of a group of local residents, leading to Smith's arrest by the local constable on "disorderly person" (vagrancy) charges. Smith was transported to South Bainbridge, New York. His two-day trial took place in late June, ending on July 1, 1830, and he was defended by two attorneys hired by Joseph Knight, who got him acquitted. Immediately after his release, however, he was arrested again and transported back to Colesville for a second trial, for which he was also acquitted.

After a few days home in Harmony, Smith returned to Joseph Knight's house in Colesville with Cowdery, but after they saw a mob gathering, were quickly forced to run all night back to Harmony, while pursued by the mob, stopping only once to rest under a tree. A source who said he heard Smith describe this flight in 1844 said that while resting at the tree, Smith and Cowdery were visited by Peter, James, and John who gave them their priesthood "keys", which according to Smith included "the keys of the kingdom, and of the dispensation of the ful[l]ness of times".

Definition of Smith's role in the church
Back at his home in Harmony, Pennsylvania, Smith dictated a revelation indicating that he and Cowdery should begin acting more as full-time clergy. After planting crops in Harmony, they would begin visiting the church's branches in Colesville, Fayette, and Manchester, "devote all [their] service in Zion", and while traveling, they would receive clothes, food, and money from the church as needed. John Whitmer, who had begun living with Joseph and Emma, was also given a full-time clerical role. Smith's wife Emma also wanted to know her place within the new church, and a second revelation reassured her that Smith would support her with church funds. She was not destined to be a witness of the golden plates (v. 8), but she was to act as Joseph's scribe when Cowdery was unavailable (v. 5), and she was to create a church hymnal (v. 11).

Smith, with the assistance of John Whitmer, then began to copy and compile the revelations Smith had dictated up to that point, while Cowdery returned to Fayette. Cowdery and most of the Whitmer family in Fayette became alarmed, however, when they learned that Smith had added a phrase to the "Articles and Covenants of the Church of Christ", requiring good works as a prerequisite for baptism, and Cowdery commanded Smith to retract the added phrase. Smith had to travel to Fayette to convince Cowdery and the Whitmers "that the sentence was reasonable, and according to Scripture".

In August 1830, back in Harmony, Smith began once again to arouse resentment with the neighbors, and Emma's parents finally turned against him. On the urging of Nathaniel Lewis, a Methodist deacon who was married to Isaac Hale's sister, Isaac Hale indicated he would no longer offer Smith and other church members his protection. As he began to fear for his safety, he dictated a revelation that it was not safe to buy wine or liquor from the church's enemies, and that any wine or liquor consumed by church members, including sacramental wine, must be made by church members.

Given the resentment in Harmony, and the continued open hostility in Colesville, Smith moved in September 1830 to Fayette, where the Whitmer family had once again offered him residence. In Fayette, Smith found that Hiram Page, one of the Eight Witnesses, had been dictating revelations using his own seer stone, and that Oliver Cowdery, the Whitmer family, and most church members had been accepting them as the word of God. Page's revelations had to do with the establishment of Zion, including the location of the "New Jerusalem" city predicted in the Book of Mormon (Ether, ch. 13).

Page's revelations, and their general acceptance as scripture by the Fayette branch, weighed upon Smith as he prepared for the church's second conference, scheduled for September 26, 1830. Prior to that conference, Smith dictated a revelation to Cowdery indicating, for the first time, that Smith alone was "appointed to receive commandments and revelations in the Church". Cowdery would continue to have his own written revelations, but he was to "write them not by way of commandment", and he was particularly forbidden to command Smith, whom the revelation described was to be "at the head of the church". Furthermore, after the conference, Cowdery would be sent on a mission "among the Lamanites" (Native Americans). As to Page's revelations, they originated from Satan, and in fact nobody knew the location of the "New Jerusalem", though it would be somewhere "among the Lamanites".

In preparation for the church's second conference, Smith also dictated his most significant revelation since the Articles and Covenants of the Church of Christ. The revelation contained grand eschatological themes, and stated that the "elect" would be "gathered in unto one place, upon the face of this land" in anticipation of the Tribulation.

At the church's second conference, dated September 26, 1830, the church discussed Page's revelations, and Page agreed to renounce his seer stone and his revelations. Smith then dictated a series of revelations chastising David Whitmer and calling several missionaries.

Mission to the "Lamanites" and recruitment of Sidney Rigdon
In October 1830, after the Second Conference, Smith dispatched Oliver Cowdery on his mission to the "Lamanites". Cowdery was accompanied by Parley P. Pratt, a recent convert who had been a missionary for the Disciples of Christ in Amherst, Ohio. On their way to the "Lamanites", the missionaries passed by Kirtland, Ohio, where there was a Disciples of Christ congregation, and converted its minister Sidney Rigdon and about 20 members of his congregation. Then Cowdery's delegation continued toward their destination of the "Lamanites" west of the Mississippi River.

Meanwhile, Rigdon traveled the opposite direction from Ohio to Fayette, New York to see Smith, arriving in December 1830. To mark the occasion, Smith dictated a revelation directed to Rigdon comparing Rigdon with John the Baptist, stating that like John, Rigdon had previously "baptized by water unto repentance, but they received not the Holy Ghost". But now, when Rigdon would baptize, they would "receive the Holy Ghost by the laying on of hands, even as the apostles of old". Furthermore, Rigdon was to watch over Smith, that Smith's "faith fail not", and as long as Smith was faithful, he would have the "keys" to reveal all the "mysteries" of God that had previously been "sealed". If Smith was not faithful, God would "plant [another] in his stead".

In the absence of Cowdery, Rigdon became Smith's new scribe, and Smith dictated to Rigdon what Smith said was a translation of the Prophecy of Enoch, a "lost book" referred to in the Book of Jude. The project of translating the "sealed" mysteries of God was soon postponed, however, as a revelation in late December 1830 indicated that the church headquarters was to move from Fayette to Kirtland to await Oliver Cowdery's return there from his mission to the "Lamanites".

Notes

References

Sources

.
.
.
.
.
 (see Joseph Smith: Rough Stone Rolling).
.
.
.
.
.
.
.
.
.
.
.
.
.
.
.
.
.
.
.
.
.
.
 .
.
.
.
 .
 .
.
 .
.
.
.
.
.
.
.
 .
.
 Also August 1, 1829; August 8, 1829; August 29, 1829.
.
.
.
.
.
.
.
.
.
.
.
.
 .
.
.
.
.
.
.
 .
.
.
.

History of the Latter Day Saint movement
Joseph Smith
1827 beginnings
1830 endings